The 1907 Brigg by-election was held on 26 February 1907.  The by-election was held due to the resignation of the incumbent Liberal MP, Harold Reckitt.  It was won by the Conservative candidate Berkeley Sheffield.

History

Result

Aftermath

References

1907 in England
Brigg
1907 elections in the United Kingdom
By-elections to the Parliament of the United Kingdom in Lincolnshire constituencies